The 1975 Taça de Portugal Final was the final match of the 1974–75 Taça de Portugal, the 35th season of the Taça de Portugal, the premier Portuguese football cup competition organized by the Portuguese Football Federation (FPF). The match was played on 14 June 1975 at the Estádio José Alvalade in Lisbon, and opposed two Primeira Liga sides: Benfica and Boavista. Boavista defeated Benfica 2–1 to claim the Taça de Portugal for a first time.

Match

Details

References

1975
Taca
S.L. Benfica matches
Boavista F.C. matches